Arunachalam R. Lakshmanan (22 March 1942 – 27 August 2020) was a judge of the Supreme Court of India.

He studied in Chennai. Before his elevation to the Supreme Court in 2002, he served as a judge on the Madras High Court and Kerala High Court. He was also appointed Chief Justice of Rajasthan High Court in 2000 and Andhra Pradesh High Court in 2001. He retired in 2007.

He hailed from the Nagarathar community and his native is Devakottai, Tamil Nadu. He served as chairman of the Law Commission of India during 2006–2009. Lakshmanan was representing Tamil Nadu in the Mullai Periyar Panel appointed by the Hon'ble Supreme Court of India. The panel is headed by Justice A.S. Anand. 

He died in August 2020 from COVID-19, two days after his wife died from the virus.

References

1942 births
2020 deaths
Justices of the Supreme Court of India
St Joseph's College, Tiruchirappalli alumni
Chief Justices of the Rajasthan High Court
20th-century Indian judges
21st-century Indian judges
Politicians from Chennai
Chief Justices of the Kerala High Court
Deaths from the COVID-19 pandemic in India